The Arabic-language satirical magazine al-Alam (Arabic: العلم; DMG: al-ʿĀlam; English: "The World") was published weekly in Cairo between 1926 and 1927 in a total of 51 issues. Its founder and editor was ʿAli Fahmi Kamil (1870-1926 ), who also served as manager of the journal al-Liwaʾ. The journal deals mostly with political and social events of its time. In 1927, the magazine was merged with another publication, Kull shay, to form the periodical Kull šayʾ wa-l-ʿālam.

References

1926 establishments in Egypt
1927 disestablishments in Egypt
Arabic-language magazines
Defunct political magazines published in Egypt
Magazines established in 1926
Magazines disestablished in 1927
Magazines published in Cairo
Satirical magazines
Egyptian political satire
Weekly magazines published in Egypt